The 1988 Cleveland Browns season was the team's 39th season with the National Football League.

Despite taking the Browns to the playoffs for the fourth consecutive year, head coach Marty Schottenheimer was fired at the end of the 1988 season. He left the Browns having compiled a record of 44–27 (a 62% winning percentage) with the team. (Schottenheimer would later go through a similar scenario with the San Diego Chargers: they fired him after the 2006 season, during which the Chargers posted a 14–2 record and then lost their first playoff game.) The Browns finished the season with a 10–6 record, tied for second place in the AFC Central with the Houston Oilers. The Browns were awarded second place by posting a better division record than the Oilers. The Browns clinched a playoff berth for the 4th straight season. In the playoffs, they lost to the Oilers in the Wild Card game, 24–23. As of 2020, this remains the last time the Browns swept the Steelers.

Offseason

NFL Draft

Personnel

Staff

Roster

Regular season

Schedule 

Note: Intra-division opponents are in bold text.

Postseason

Game summaries

Week 1

Week 2

Week 9

Week 14

Week 16

Standings

Playoffs

AFC wild card game 

Oilers cornerback Richard Johnson's interception set up kicker Tony Zendejas' game-clinching 49-yard field goal with 1:54 left in the game. After the Browns scored first on a 33-yard field goal by Matt Bahr, Houston marched 91 yards to score on quarterback Warren Moon's 14-yard touchdown pass to running back Allen Pinkett. Then on Cleveland's next drive, Oilers defensive lineman Richard Byrd recovered quarterback Don Strock's fumble to set up Pinkett's 16-yard touchdown run. Bahr later made two field goals to cut Houston's lead, 14–9, before halftime. In the third quarter, backup quarterback Mike Pagel, who replaced an injured Strock, threw a 14-yard touchdown completion to wide receiver Webster Slaughter to put the Browns ahead, 16–14. However, the Oilers marched on a 76-yard drive that was capped with running back Lorenzo White's 1-yard rushing touchdown. After Johnson's interception and Zendejas' subsequent game-clinching 49-yard field goal, Slaughter caught a 2-yard touchdown reception to close out the scoring.

References

External links 
 1988 Cleveland Browns at Pro Football Reference (Profootballreference.com)
 1988 Cleveland Browns Statistics at jt-sw.com
 1988 Cleveland Browns Schedule at jt-sw.com
 1988 Cleveland Browns at DatabaseFootball.com  

Cleveland
Cleveland Browns seasons
Cleveland